Jens Lehmann (born 19 December 1967) is a German politician of the CDU and a former professional cyclist and double Olympic champion. Despite his many successes (including being part of the first team pursuit squad to break the 4-minute barrier for the 4,000-metre team pursuit), he will probably be remembered best as the person caught by Chris Boardman riding the revolutionary Lotus Superbike, in the final of the 1992 Olympic individual pursuit in Barcelona. Lehmann was World Champion at that time.

Political career
In the 2017 German federal election, Lehmann was elected as member of the Bundestag, representing the Leipzig I district. In parliament, he has been serving on the Defence Committee (since 2018) and the Sports Committee (since 2022).

Other activities
 Agentur für Innovationen in der Cybersicherheit, Member of the Supervisory Board (since 2022)
 German War Graves Commission, Member

References

External links
 
 
 

1967 births
Living people
People from Stolberg, Saxony-Anhalt
German male cyclists
Cyclists at the 1992 Summer Olympics
Cyclists at the 2000 Summer Olympics
Olympic cyclists of Germany
Olympic gold medalists for Germany
Olympic silver medalists for Germany
Olympic medalists in cycling
Cyclists from Saxony-Anhalt
UCI Track Cycling World Champions (men)
Medalists at the 1992 Summer Olympics
Medalists at the 2000 Summer Olympics
German track cyclists
Members of the Bundestag 2021–2025
Members of the Bundestag 2017–2021
Members of the Bundestag for the Christian Democratic Union of Germany
20th-century births
East German male cyclists
People from Bezirk Halle
German sportsperson-politicians